Lobata is a genus of green alga.

References

Ulvaceae
Ulvophyceae genera